Zaplana is a dispersed settlement in the Municipality of Logatec in the Inner Carniola region of Slovenia. It lies in the hills to the north of the town of Logatec. It is sometimes considered part of Zaplana in the Municipality of Vrhnika although it is separated from it by a hill, not in continuous territory with it, and in a different municipality.

References

External links
Zaplana on Geopedia

Populated places in the Municipality of Logatec